Heinz Baumann may refer to:

 Heinz Baumann (actor) (born 1928), German actor
 Heinz Hubert Baumann (1946–2010), German priest